Allium karataviense is an Asian species of onion in the Amaryllis family. It is commonly known as Turkistan onion or ornamental onion.

It is a native to central Asia (Kazakhstan, Kyrgyzstan, Tajikistan, Uzbekistan, Afghanistan) (and cultivated elsewhere as an ornamental plant). It has been selected for the Great Plant Picks list of outstanding plants for the maritime Pacific Northwest. The Latin specific epithet karataviense means of the Karatau mountains in Kazakhstan, in reference to the plant's native range.

Description 

Allium karataviense is an herbaceous, bulb-forming species. It produces a basal rosette of wide, arching leaves. Basal leaves are broad-elliptic, spreading, gray-green, and appear in pairs. Flowers are lilac to pink in color and have a mild fragrance.

References 

karataviense
Flora of Central Asia
Tian Shan
Plants described in 1875
Garden plants of Asia